The Debye–Hückel theory was proposed by Peter Debye and Erich Hückel as a theoretical explanation for departures from ideality in solutions of electrolytes and plasmas.
 
It is a linearized Poisson–Boltzmann model, which assumes an extremely simplified model of electrolyte solution but nevertheless gave accurate predictions of mean activity coefficients for ions in dilute solution. The Debye–Hückel equation provides a starting point for modern treatments of non-ideality of electrolyte solutions.

Overview 
In the chemistry of electrolyte solutions, an ideal solution is a solution whose colligative properties are proportional to the concentration of the solute. Real solutions may show departures from this kind of ideality. In order to accommodate these effects in the thermodynamics of solutions, the concept of activity was introduced: the properties are then proportional to the activities of the ions. Activity, a, is proportional to concentration, c. The proportionality constant is known as an activity coefficient, .

In an ideal electrolyte solution the activity coefficients for all the ions are equal to one. Ideality of an electrolyte solution can be achieved only in very dilute solutions. Non-ideality of more concentrated solutions arises principally (but not exclusively) because ions of opposite charge attract each other due to electrostatic forces, while ions of the same charge repel each other. In consequence ions are not randomly distributed throughout the solution, as they would be in an ideal solution.

Activity coefficients of single ions cannot be measured experimentally because an electrolyte solution must contain both positively charged ions and negatively charged ions. Instead, a mean activity coefficient,  is defined. For example, with the electrolyte NaCl

In general, the mean activity coefficient of a fully dissociated electrolyte of formula AnBm is given by

Activity coefficients are themselves functions of concentration as the amount of inter-ionic interaction increases as the concentration of the electrolyte increases. Debye and Hückel developed a theory with which single ion activity coefficients could be calculated. By calculating the mean activity coefficients from them the theory could be tested against experimental data. It was found to give excellent agreement for "dilute" solutions.

The model 

A description of Debye–Hückel theory includes a very detailed discussion of the assumptions and their limitations as well as the mathematical development and applications.

A snapshot of a 2-dimensional section of an idealized electrolyte solution is shown in the picture. The ions are shown as spheres with unit electrical charge. The solvent (pale blue) is shown as a uniform medium, without structure. On average, each ion is surrounded more closely by ions of opposite charge than by ions of like charge. These concepts were developed into a quantitative theory involving ions of charge z1e+ and z2e−, where z can be any integer. The principal assumption is that departure from ideality is due to electrostatic interactions between ions, mediated by Coulomb's law: the force of interaction between two electric charges, separated by a distance, r in a medium of relative permittivity εr is given by

It is also assumed that
The solute is completely dissociated; it is a strong electrolyte.
Ions are spherical and are not polarized by the surrounding electric field. Solvation of ions is ignored except insofar as it determines the effective sizes of the ions.
The solvent plays no role other than providing a medium of constant relative permittivity (dielectric constant).
There is no electrostriction.
Individual ions surrounding a "central" ion can be represented by a statistically averaged cloud of continuous charge density, with a minimum distance of closest approach.

The last assumption means that each cation is surrounded by a spherically symmetric cloud of other ions. The cloud has a net negative charge. Similarly each anion is surrounded by a cloud with net positive charge.

Mathematical development 

The deviation from ideality is taken to be a function of the potential energy resulting from the electrostatic interactions between ions and their surrounding clouds. To calculate this energy two steps are needed.

The first step is to specify the electrostatic potential for ion j by means of Poisson's equation

ψ(r) is the total potential at a distance, r, from the central ion and ρ(r) is the averaged charge density of the surrounding cloud at that distance. To apply this formula it is essential that the cloud has spherical symmetry, that is, the charge density is a function only of distance from the central ion as this allows the Poisson equation to be cast in terms of spherical coordinates with no angular dependence.

The second step is to calculate the charge density by means of a Boltzmann distribution.

where kB is Boltzmann constant and T is the temperature. This distribution also depends on the potential ψ(r) and this introduces a serious difficulty in terms of the superposition principle. Nevertheless, the two equations can be combined to produce the Poisson–Boltzmann equation.

Solution of this equation is far from straightforward. Debye and Hückel expanded the exponential as a truncated Taylor series to first order. The zeroth order term vanishes because the solution is on average electrically neutral (so that Σ ni zi = 0), which leaves us with only the first order term.  The result has the form of the Helmholtz equation

,

which has an analytical solution. This equation applies to electrolytes with equal numbers of ions of each charge. Nonsymmetrical electrolytes require another term with ψ2. For symmetrical electrolytes, this reduces to the modified spherical Bessel equation

As ,  must not diverge, so .

 

This is the potential energy of a single ion in a solution. The multiple-charge generalization from electrostatics gives an expression for the potential energy of the entire solution (see also: Debye–Hückel equation). The mean activity coefficient is given by the logarithm of this quantity as follows (see also: Extensions of the theory)

where I is the ionic strength and a0 is a parameter that represents the distance of closest approach of ions. For aqueous solutions at 25 °C A = 0.51 mol−1/2dm3/2 and B = 3.29 nm−1mol−1/2dm3/2

The most significant aspect of this result is the prediction that the mean activity coefficient is a function of ionic strength rather than the electrolyte concentration. For very low values of the ionic strength the value of the denominator in the expression above becomes nearly equal to one. In this situation the mean activity coefficient is proportional to the square root of the ionic strength. This is known as the Debye–Hückel limiting law.

Limitations and extensions 

This  equation for  gives satisfactory agreement with experimental measurements for low electrolyte concentrations, typically less than 10−3 mol/L. Deviations from the theory occur at higher concentrations and with electrolytes that produce ions of higher charges, particularly unsymmetrical electrolytes. Essentially these deviations occur because the model is oversimplified, so there is little to be gained making small adjustments to the model. The individual assumptions can be challenged in turn.
Complete dissociation. Ion association may take place, particularly with ions of higher charge. This was followed up in detail by Niels Bjerrum. The Bjerrum length is the separation at which the electrostatic interaction between two ions is comparable in magnitude to kT.
Weak electrolytes. A weak electrolyte is one that is not fully dissociated. As such it has a dissociation constant. The dissociation constant can be used to calculate the extent of dissociation and hence, make the necessary correction needed to calculate activity coefficients.
Ions are spherical, not point charges and are not polarized. Many ions such as the nitrate ion, NO3−, are not spherical. Polyatomic ions are also polarizable.
Role of the solvent. The solvent is not a structureless medium but is made up of molecules. The water molecules in aqueous solution are both dipolar and polarizable. Both cations and anions have a strong primary solvation shell and a weaker secondary solvation shell. Ion–solvent interactions are ignored in Debye–Hückel theory.
Moreover, ionic radius is assumed to be negligible, but at higher concentrations, the ionic radius becomes comparable to the radius of the ionic atmosphere.
Most extensions to Debye–Hückel theory are empirical in nature. They usually allow the Debye–Hückel equation to be followed at low concentration and add further terms in some power of the ionic strength to fit experimental observations. The main extensions are the Davies equation, Pitzer equations and specific ion interaction theory.

Electrolytes mixtures
The theory can be applied also to dilute solutions of mixed electrolytes. Freezing point depression measurements has been used to this purpose.

Conductivity 

The treatment given so far is for a system not subject to an external electric field. When conductivity is measured the system is subject to an oscillating external field due to the application of an AC voltage to electrodes immersed in the solution. Debye and Hückel modified their theory in 1926 and their theory was further modified by Lars Onsager in 1927. All the postulates of the original theory were retained. In addition it was assumed that the electric field causes the charge cloud to be distorted away from spherical symmetry. After taking this into account, together with the specific requirements of moving ions, such as viscosity and electrophoretic effects, Onsager was able to derive a theoretical expression to account for the empirical relation known as Kohlrausch's Law, for the molar conductivity, Λm. 

 is known as the limiting molar conductivity, K is an empirical constant and c is the electrolyte concentration. Limiting here means "at the limit of the infinite dilution").
Onsager's expression is

where A and B are constants that depend only on known quantities such as temperature, the charges on the ions and the dielectric constant and viscosity of the solvent. This is known as the Debye–Hückel–Onsager equation. However, this equation only applies to very dilute solutions and has been largely superseded by other equations due to Fuoss and Onsager, 1932 and 1957 and later.

References 

Thermodynamic models
Electrochemistry
Equilibrium chemistry
Peter Debye